Living Proof: The Farewell Tour (also referred to as simply The Farewell Tour and later dubbed The Never Can Say Goodbye Tour) was the fifth concert tour by American singer-actress Cher to promote her twenty-fourth studio album, Living Proof and her eighth official compilation album, The Very Best of Cher. It began on June 14, 2002 in Toronto, Ontario, Canada and was originally planned as a 59-date tour in North America.

Due to the popularity of the tour, Cher decided to extend it by 100 more shows in North America then, after the tour concluded in 2004, she announced plans of playing in Europe, Oceania and Asia to play in territories she either had never been to or had not played for a long time. The final show took place at the Hollywood Bowl in Los Angeles after a record-breaking 325 dates, grossing well over $200 million and earning Cher the Guinness World Record for the "Highest Grossing Tour by a Female Artist" at the time.

The tour was planned similarly to her previous 1999/2000 Do You Believe? Tour. The set list consisted of 21 songs, 4 video montages, dancers and aerialists. It also included a dozen costume changes, designed by Cher's longtime collaborator Bob Mackie. Some changes were made to the set list during the European and Australasian legs.

The tour generated positive reviews from critics. The concert was broadcast on NBC from American Airlines Arena, in Miami during Thanksgiving weekend. The concert special attracting near 17 million viewers and won three Primetime Emmy Awards. A DVD titled The Farewell Tour was released in summer 2003.

Although Cher stated that this would be her final tour, she returned to touring in 2014 with her Dressed to Kill Tour, which visited 49 cities in North America. However, it would remain her last world tour until she embarked on the Here We Go Again Tour (2018–2020).

Background
In January 2002, Cher said to Billboard magazine that she was contemplating a concert tour, but not for more than a year. "It honestly depends on whether or not I decide to do a couple of movies that I'm considering. It would be fun to do these new songs live, so we'll see what develops", she said. In May of the same year, she announced she would embark on a three-month tour that would be her last. She commented, "It's an artist's dream to have a career where you're continually drawing new people in, while hopefully keeping your longtime fans happy. But I'm certainly aware of the fact that it's a rare occurrence. I don't take for granted the fact that people still care about what I do on any level." She would later sarcastically remark, "I'm approaching 80 and if I did that thing everyone does, come back in five years, I'd be driving around in one of those carts you know, the ones with the joysticks you see in Costco. There are two reasons people come back. Because, like the Stones, they're broke. Again. Or they're old divas who can't wait to be out among their adoring fans. But this, this truly is it."

The tour kicked off in Toronto in June 2002 and would continue onward for a record-breaking 326 shows, ending in Los Angeles in April 2005. The final show was performed at the Hollywood Bowl, incidentally where Cher made her first concert appearance with former husband, Sonny Bono. Cher explains the longevity of the tour was based on asking her manager to continue to add dates because of the audience reaction. The tour was originally slated to end with the Australasian leg in the Fall of 2004, however, an additional North American leg was added in January 2005. She concluded, "I really don't want to stop. They're making me stop! I told the tour managers, 'But I haven't done Vermont or Delaware', and they said, 'There are no venues big enough, dear'. And then I said, 'So go out and build some! After that, physical restraint was mentioned.' But seriously, I figured if I didn't stop, I was going to go into permanent Marlene Dietrich mode. [...] And these are the song I sang for audiences in Alaska, Ohio, Connecticut... and then I'd keep falling off my elephant and eventually become a recluse." After the tour, Cher had hopes of recording a Christmas album and a country duet album. Additionally, she wanted to continue filming movies, return to doing TV specials and appearing on Broadway.

The tour also gave Cher the opportunity to perform in new territories in Europe and North America, including her first tour to reach New Zealand. According to the Dakota Student, the performance at the Alerus Center in Grand Forks, North Dakota was the largest [single night] audience the artist has performed for during her solo career. Although the article states over 20,000 were in attendance, Billboard later reported an audience of 19,531 spectators. This record was beat when she performed in Stockholm, Sweden at The Friends Arena though when she played to over 27,000 fans.

Concert synopsis

The show begins with a video displaying a young Cher leaving her home. The video instantly progresses to an adult Cher walking into a blue room. The video continues to show Cher throughout the years in numerous music videos and live performances, including a few from The Sonny & Cher Comedy Hour, The Cher Show and Cher... Special. It then shows the singer during a photo shoot wearing many of her well-known costumes from the 70's and 80's. The video concludes showing the cover art of all of the singer's albums and singles. The final image shows Cher on a metallic purple background surround by butterflies as she descends on stage via chandelier performing U2's "I Still Haven't Found What I'm Looking For". "Song for the Lonely" continues the set before the singer pauses to acknowledge the audience explaining why it is her final tour. She exits the stage as her dancers perform a routine to "Gayatri Mantra", a well-known Hindu mantra. As the routine ends, Cher appears on a papier-mâché elephant performing "All or Nothing". The show continues with an aerial dance interlude and a performance of "I Found Someone".

After an extended guitar solo, Cher appears on the second tier of the stage in a tribal garment for a new rendition of "Bang Bang (My Baby Shot Me Down)". The next segment of the show begins with clips of Cher and ex-husband Sonny Bono performing three of their popular songs "The Beat Goes On", "Baby Don't Go", and "I Got You Babe". When the video ends, Cher appears on stage performing "All I Really Want to Do", which she explains was her first hit record. The segment continues with a medley of her solo singles "Half-Breed", "Gypsies, Tramps and Thieves" and "Dark Lady".  The show progresses with a video montage of Cher's sitcom, "The Cher Show". Next, her dancers appear in leisure suit mimicking choreography displayed in Saturday Night Fever. Cher then emerges performing "Take Me Home". The video during the dance routine was from the disco section from the Cher... Special, aired in 1978 featuring Dolly Parton. Several elements of the show feature moments from this Special including the opening film, which features Dolly Parton and Cher singing the 'Heaven and Hell medley'. The song ends with another dance routine before Cher rejoins to perform "The Way of Love". The segment ends with a video of Cher perform scenes from West Side Story, originally shown in 1978 for "Cher... Special". This leads into another video showing clips from the singer's theatrical films including, Silkwood, Moonstruck and Mermaids. The video ends and Cher appears onstage to perform "After All". The show continues with "Just Like Jesse James", "Heart of Stone" and "The Shoop Shoop Song (It's in His Kiss)".

After Cher exits the stage, a video is played displaying various interviews of the singer from the 70s to 00s. The clips are interloped with outtakes of her recent music video for the song "Alive Again. The music video for "Strong Enough" is shown for the first verse before Cher appears onstage to conclude the song. This final segment concludes with a performance of  "If I Could Turn Back Time". The show continues with an encore segment as Cher returns to the stage to perform "Believe".

Critical reception
James Sullivan (San Francisco Chronicle) remarked how Cher is still viable amongst her younger peers stating, "The Britney effect of the latter look was unmistakable. Cher is well aware that her chameleonic glitz set the stage for the current era of stadium-size razzle-dazzle. She's comfortable enough to see such imitation as flattery, not theft."

Jim Farber (New York Daily News) felt the singer's numerous costumes changes and video interludes were a huge distraction from the overall show. In his article he writes, "During the course of Cher's hour-and-45-minute performances, she has been dressing as a bespangled circus ringleader, an iron-haired hippie chick, an S&M tart and what looks like Conan the Barbarian's favorite concubine. At one point, she even models that barely there black getup she wore in the 13-year-old hit video for "If I Could Turn Back Time." Which means she may be the only 56-year-old in history to appear in public in a thong. Oh, yes ... the show also features music."

Jon Pareles (The New York Times) praised her show at the Madison Square Garden remarking, "Once more, Cher triumphed over restraint, aging and gravity, standing proudly alongside her younger selves in the video clips. In her finale, Believe, she appeared in a long silvery dress while her dancers wore futuristic space suits. The song's verses used an electronic filter on Cher's vocal, turning her into cyber-Cher, a hit machine immune to sagging flesh. The song promises life after love; Cher, no doubt, will continue a celebrity life after soaking up her touring audiences' love one last time."

Broadcasts and recordings

In 2002, the concerts at the American Airlines Arena, in Miami were filmed for an upcoming television special to be aired during Thanksgiving weekend. The concert special appeared on NBC and attracted near 17 million viewers. This concert special was later released on DVD and CD formats. The concert footage would achieve further acclaim earning three Primetime Emmy Awards for Outstanding Variety, Music or Comedy Series, Outstanding Costumes for a Variety or Music Program and Technical Direction, Camerawork, Video for a Miniseries, Movie or a Special. A DVD was released in the summer of 2003 and has sold over 400,000 copies. The DVD contains bonus footage including a behind–the–scenes documentary, a montage of Cher's costumes, a meet and greet with the team, extra monologues and the full performance of West Side Story from 1978. Additionally, it features rehearsal footage of "Save Up All Your Tears", "We All Sleep Alone" and "A Different Kind of Love Song".

Set list

 "I Still Haven't Found What I'm Looking For"
 "Song for the Lonely"
 "Gayatri Mantra" 
 "All or Nothing"
 "I Found Someone"
 "Bang Bang (My Baby Shot Me Down)"	
 "All I Really Want to Do" 
 "Half-Breed" / "Gypsys, Tramps & Thieves" / "Dark Lady"
 "Take Me Home"
 "The Way of Love"
 "After All"
 "Just Like Jesse James" 
 "Heart of Stone"
 "The Shoop Shoop Song (It's in His Kiss)"
 "Strong Enough"
 "If I Could Turn Back Time"
Encore
 "Believe"

Shows

Cancelled shows

See also 
 List of highest-grossing concert tours

Notes

Personnel
Production Crew
Tour Director: Doriana Sanchez
Musical Director: Paul Mirkovich
Lighting Director: Kille Knobel
Video Director: Dave Neugebauer
Assistant Video Director: Deb Collins
Tour Manager: Nick Cua
Production Manager: Malcolm Weldon
Stage Manager: Frank Carra
Set Designer: Jeremy Railton
Lighting Designer: Abigail Rosen Holmes
Video Designer: Christine Strand
Video Engineer: Jason Harvey
Production Coordinator: Dana Jaeger
Lighting Crew Chief: Ian Tucker
Head Rigger: Steve Olean
Head Carpenter: Courtney Jones
Lighting Crew: John Amorelli, Gregg Brooks, Jason Gangi, John Ramsey and Jeremy Schilling
Video Crew: Richard Davis, David Driscol and Kurt Verhelle
Riggers: Leti Alcala, Storm Sollars and James Stratton
Carpenters: Michael Garrigan, Russell Glen, Ken Kinard, David Roth, Rick Stucker and Kurt Wagner
Source:

Band
Keyboards: Jim McGorman and Paul Mirkovich
Guitars: David Barry and Michael Garrigan
Bass guitar: Bill Sharpe
Keyboards: Ollie Marland
Drums: Mark Schulman and Matt Sorum1
Dancers: Shannon Beach, Bubba Carr, Suzanne Easter, Jamal Story, Sal Vassallo, Dreya Weber, Kevin Wilson and Addie Yungmee
Backing Vocalists: Stacy Campbell and Patti Darcy Jones
Supporting Vocalists: David Barry, Michael Garrigan, Ollie Marland, Jim McGorman, Paul Mirkovich and Bill Sharpe
1Sorum served as drummer for the tour during the first North American leg only.

References

Cher concert tours
2002 concert tours
2003 concert tours
2004 concert tours
2005 concert tours
Farewell concert tours